The men's doubles tournament of the 2015 BWF World Championships (World Badminton Championships) took place from August 10 to 16. Ko Sung-hyun and Shin Baek-cheol entered the competition as the reigning champions, but lost to Goh V Shem and Tan Wee Kiong in the second round.

Seeds

  Lee Yong-dae / Yoo Yeon-seong (semifinals)
  Mathias Boe / Carsten Mogensen (quarterfinals)
  Mohammad Ahsan / Hendra Setiawan (champion)
  Chai Biao / Hong Wei (2nd round)
  Fu Haifeng / Zhang Nan (quarterfinals)
  Hiroyuki Endo / Kenichi Hayakawa (semifinals)
  Ko Sung-hyun / Shin Baek-cheol (2nd round)
  Lee Sheng-mu / Tsai Chia-hsin (2nd round)
  Liu Xiaolong / Qiu Zihan (final)
  Mads Conrad-Petersen / Mads Pieler Kolding (3rd round)
  Vladimir Ivanov / Ivan Sozonov (second round)
  Kim Ki-jung / Kim Sa-rang (3rd round)
  Angga Pratama / Ricky Karanda Suwardi (quarterfinals)
  Kenta Kazuno / Kazushi Yamada (3rd round)
  Kim Astrup / Anders Skaarup Rasmussen (3rd round)
  Hirokatsu Hashimoto / Noriyasu Hirata (3rd round)

Draw

Finals

Section 1

Section 2

Section 3

Section 4

References
BWF Website

2015 BWF World Championships